Hapoel Haifa Football Club is an Israeli football club located in Haifa. During the 2017-18 campaign they will be competing in the following competitions:Israeli Premier League, State Cup, Toto Cup Ligat Al.

Club

Kits

 Provider: Diadora
 Main Sponsor: First Index
 Secondary Sponsor:  Moked Hat'ama

First team

Transfers

Summer

In:

Out:

Winter

In:

Out:

Preseason and friendlies

Competitions

Overview

Ligat Ha'Al

Results summary

Results by matchday

Regular season

Regular season table

Results overview

Play-off

Championship round table

Results overview

State Cup

Round of 32

Round of 16

Quarter final

Semi-final

Final

Toto Cup Ligat Al

Statistics

Appearances and goals

 

 

|-
|colspan="12"|Players away from Hapoel Haifa on loan:
|-

|-

|-
|colspan="12"|Players who appeared for Hapoel Haifa  that left during the season:
|-

|}

Goalscorers

Last updated: 21 May 2018

Assists

Last updated: 21 May 2018

Clean sheets

Updated on 21 May 2018

Disciplinary record

Updated on 21 May 2018

Suspensions

Updated on 21 May 2018

Penalties

Updated on 21 May 2018

Overall

{| class="wikitable" style="text-align: center"
|-
!
!Total
!Home
!Away
!Natural
|-
|align=left| Games played          || 46 || 21 || 23 || 2
|-
|align=left| Games won             || 21 || 10 || 10 || 1
|- 
|align=left| Games drawn           || 15 || 5 || 9 || 1
|-
|align=left| Games lost             || 10 || 6 || 4 || -
|-
|align=left| Biggest win             ||  4 - 0 vs Hapoel Acre || 4 - 0 vs Hapoel Acre || 3 - 0 vs Maccabi Haifa || 3 - 1 vs Beitar Jerusalem
|-
|align=left| Biggest loss       || 0 - 4 vs Maccabi Tel Aviv || 1 - 4 vs Hapoel Be'er Sheva1 - 4 vs Maccabi Haifa || 0 - 4 vs Maccabi Tel Aviv || -
|-
|align=left| Biggest win (League)    ||  4 - 0 vs Hapoel Acre ||  4 - 0 vs Hapoel Acre || 3 - 0 vs Maccabi Haifa || -
|-
|align=left| Biggest loss (League)   || 0 - 4 vs Maccabi Tel Aviv || 1 - 4 vs Hapoel Be'er Sheva || 0 - 4 vs Maccabi Tel Aviv || -
|-
|align=left| Biggest win (Cup)    || 3 - 1 vs Beitar Jerusalem || - || 2 - 1 vs Hapoel Acre2 - 1 vs Hapoel Petah Tikva || 3 - 1 vs Beitar Jerusalem
|-
|align=left| Biggest loss (Cup)     || - || - || - || -
|-
|align=left| Biggest win (Toto)    || 1 - 0 vs Hapoel Ironi Kiryat Shmona || - || 1 - 0 vs Hapoel Ironi Kiryat Shmona || -
|-
|align=left| Biggest loss (Toto)   || 1 - 4 vs Maccabi Haifa || 1 - 4 vs Maccabi Haifa || - || -
|-
|align=left| Goals scored           || 61 || 29 || 29 || 3
|-
|align=left| Goals conceded         || 51 || 24 || 26 || 1
|-
|align=left| Goal difference        || 10 || 5 || 3 || 2
|-
|align=left| Clean sheets            || 16 || 7 || 8 || 1
|-
|--
|-
|align=left| Yellow cards          || 94 || 40 || 53 || 1
|-
|align=left| Red cards               || 6 || 4 || 2 || 0
|-
|align=left| Most appearances      ||colspan=4|  Dor Malul,  Maxim Plakuschenko (44)
|-
|align=left| Most goals        || colspan=4|  Alon Turgeman (17)
|-
|align=left| Most Assist        || colspan=4|  Hanan Maman (7)
|-
|align=left| Penalties for   || 2 || 1 || 1 || -
|-
|align=left| Penalties against   || 4 || 2 || 2 || -
|-
|align=left| Winning rate         || % || % || % || %
|-

References

Hapoel Haifa F.C. seasons
Hapoel Haifa